The 1994–95 Stanford Cardinal men's basketball team represented Stanford University as a member of the Pac-10 Conference during the 1994–95 NCAA Division I men's basketball season.  The team was led by head coach Mike Montgomery and played their home games at Maples Pavilion. Stanford finished fifth in the Pac-10 regular season standings and received an at-large bid to the 1995 NCAA tournament. Playing as the No. 10 seed in the East region, the Cardinal defeated No. 7 seed  in the opening round before falling to No. 2 seed UMass in the second round. Stanford finished with an overall record of 20–9 (10–8 Pac-10).

Roster

Schedule and results

|-
!colspan=12 style=| Regular season

|-
!colspan=12 style=| NCAA tournament

Schedule Source:

Rankings

References

Stanford Cardinal
Stanford Cardinal men's basketball seasons
Stanford Cardinal men's basketball
Stanford Cardinal men's basketball
Stanford